Conrad Noll (1836–1925) was a German-born soldier who fought for the Union in the U.S. Civil War. He received the Medal of Honor for his actions during the Battle of Spotsylvania as a member of the 20th Michigan Infantry. He was born in Germany on February 20, 1836 and died in Ann Arbor, Michigan on May 26, 1925. He is buried in the Forest Hill Cemetery of Ann Arbor.

Military service 
Noll enlisted in Company D of the 20th Michigan Infantry on August 11, 1862, at the age of 26. With his unit he participated in many battles:  Fredericksburg, Horseshoe Bend, Jackson, Vicksburg, Blue Springs, the Siege of Knoxville, the Wilderness, Spotsylvania, North Anna, Cold Harbor, and the Crater. He was wounded at the Crater, and was discharged in July 1865 from Harper Hospital in Detroit, having been promoted to the rank of Sergeant. Three of Noll's wartime diaries describing his experiences are available on microfilm at the University of Michigan's Bentley Historical Library.

Medal of Honor Citation 
Noll was awarded the Medal of Honor in 1896 for his actions at Spotsylvania on May 12, 1864. The citation reads:

"The President of the United States of America, in the name of Congress, takes pleasure in presenting the Medal of Honor to Sergeant Conrad Noll, United States Army, for extraordinary heroism on 12 May 1864, while serving with Company D, 20th Michigan Infantry, in action at Spotsylvania, Virginia. Sergeant Noll seized the colors, the Color Bearer having been shot down, and gallantly fought his way out with them, though the enemy were on the left flank and rear."

References 

German-born Medal of Honor recipients
Social history of the American Civil War
People of Michigan in the American Civil War
American Civil War recipients of the Medal of Honor
1836 births
1925 deaths